Jamaan Al-Dossari (born 6 September 1993) is a Saudi Arabian professional footballer who plays for Al-Kholood as a defender.

References

External links 
 

Living people
1993 births
Saudi Arabian footballers
Al-Shabab FC (Riyadh) players
Najran SC players
Al-Faisaly FC players
Al-Fateh SC players
Damac FC players
Khaleej FC players
Al-Sahel SC (Saudi Arabia) players
Al-Kholood Club players
Saudi Professional League players
Saudi First Division League players
Association football defenders